The Beekeeper (translit. O Melissokomos) is a 1986 Greek drama art film directed by Theodoros Angelopoulos. The film is the second installment in Angelopoulos's "trilogy of silence", preceded by Voyage to Cythera and followed by Landscape in the Mist.

The Beekeeper was selected for the 43rd Venice International Film Festival. The film was the first of Angelopoulos's to use an already well-known actor, in this case, Marcello Mastroianni, who by the time has won the Best Actor award at the 1970 Cannes Film Festival once and was nominated for the Best Actor at the 50th Academy Awards.

Plot
The film follows the journey of Spyros, a beekeeper, to various parts of Greece after his daughter's wedding. Spyros has just retired as a teacher and sets out on his annual journey in spring to  move his bee hives to a series of locations with flowering plants. A girl hops on Spyros' truck, and travels with him. They visit Spyros' old friends and his wife along the way, and finally arrive at a theater owned by one of his friends, which is about to be sold. There, Spyros and the girl finally have an erotic encounter, long after Spyros has tried to coerce her into kissing but failed. The girl leaves after a few nights, before the movie ends with Spyros turning over his beehive boxes, causing him to be stung repeatedly by the understandably angry bees. The final scene sees the dying Spyros tapping on the ground, as he continues to suffer from more and more agonising stings, which reminds us of the tapping of his sick friend before Spyros left him in the hospital.

Cast
 Marcello Mastroianni as Spyros
 Nadia Mourouzi as the girl
 Serge Reggiani as the sick man
 Jenny Roussea as Spyros' wife
 Dinos Iliopoulos as Spyros' friend, owner of Ciné Pantheon
 Iakovos Panotas as soldier/the girl's boyfriend
 Vassia Panagopoulou
 Stamatis Gardelis
 Mihalis Giannatos
 Karyofyllia Karabeti
 Konstandinos Konstandopoulos
 Nikos Kouros
 Christoforos Nezer
 Stratos Pahis
 Dimitris Poulikakos
 Athinodoros Prousalis

Reception
Janet Maslin criticized The Beekeeper in 1993, writing that it "wastes Marcello Mastroianni in his title role" and that "(n)ot even those inclined to dwell on the film's occasional honeycomb imagery or its heavy sense of foreboding will find much to command the attention," arguing that The Beekeeper is interesting only in the context of Angelopoulos's other two titles in his "trilogy of silence" (which also includes Voyage to Cythera and Landscape in the Mist). It was also written in Time Out that the film "has a stately pace and a shortage of event or information that are a lot to take." John Gillett for a London Film Festival screening praised The Beekeeper as having "wonderfully textured images by Arvanitis, a succession of beautifully sustained traveling shots, and an emotional intensity which moves to a grave, overwhelming climax."

Ronald Bergan, in his obituary of Angelopoulos, described The Beekeeper as a "compelling film" which "could be called a metaphysical road movie". In The Independent, however, Holly Williams in 2010 lauded the film as "ponderously paced but poignant" and stated that "the directing is assured, and the performances restrained and heartbreakingly believable." Acquarello of Strictly Film School called the work "a haunting, compassionate, and profoundly melancholic portrait of isolation, dislocation, estrangement, and obsolescence," referring to it as an "indelible chronicle" of the contemporary Greek society.

The Beekeeper was nominated for Golden Lion at the 43rd Venice International Film Festival.

References

External links
 

1986 films
1986 drama films
1980s drama road movies
Films set in Greece
Greek drama films
1980s Greek-language films
Films directed by Theodoros Angelopoulos
Films with screenplays by Tonino Guerra
Films scored by Eleni Karaindrou
Fiction about beekeeping
Films about bees
Films shot in Florina